Crystal Swan is a 2018 Belarusian drama film directed by Darya Zhuk. It was selected as the Belarusian entry for the Best Foreign Language Film at the 91st Academy Awards, but it was not nominated.

Plot
In the 1990s, Velya hopes to leave Belarus and become a DJ in the United States. Her plans change following an error on her visa application.

Cast
Alina Nasibullina as Velya
Ivan Mulin as Stepan
Yuri Borisov as Alik
Svetlana Anikey as Velya's mother
Ilya Kapanets as Kostya
Anastasiya Garvey as Vika
Lyudmila Razumova as Alya
Natalya Onishenko as Angela
Anatoly Golub
Artem Kuren
Vyacheslav Shakalido as Mihalych

See also
 List of submissions to the 91st Academy Awards for Best Foreign Language Film
 List of Belarusian submissions for the Academy Award for Best Foreign Language Film

References

External links
 

2018 films
2018 drama films
Belarusian drama films
2010s Russian-language films